Kari Jalonen (born January 6, 1960) is a Finnish professional ice hockey coach and former player. Currently he is the head coach of Czech national team. He is not related to Finnish ice hockey coach Jukka Jalonen.

Playing career 
A product of Oulun Kärpät, Jalonen played parts of two seasons (82-83, 83-84) at the NHL level, with the Calgary Flames and Edmonton Oilers. He made a total of 37 NHL appearances. He is best known for his time in the SM-liiga, but also had stints in Sweden (Skellefteå HC) and France (Dragons de Rouen).

Jalonen represented Finland internationally on nine occasions, including with the silver medal-winning 1980 World Juniors team and the bronze medal-winning 1986 European Championship team.

Coaching career 
After his playing career, Jalonen embarked on a career in coaching. Jalonen has coached successful SM-liiga teams TPS, Kärpät and HIFK. He has won four Finnish national championships as a head coach: three with Kärpät and one with HIFK. Jalonen also played for HIFK during his playing career. He received Liiga Coach of the Year honors in 2005 and 2007.

Jalonen started as the head coach of Torpedo Nizhny Novgorod in KHL from the beginning of the 2011–12 season and parted ways with the club during the 2012–13 season. During the 2013–14 season he took over as head coach of fellow KHL team Lev Praha and guided the side to the Gagarin Cup finals, losing to Metallurg Magnitogorsk in seven games.

He was appointed head coach of Finland's national team in 2014. In April 2016, he was named head coach of SC Bern of the Swiss top-flight National League A (NLA). He guided the Finnish national team to a silver medal at the 2016 IIHF World Championships in Russia before stepping aside to take on the Bern job. He guided Bern to the Swiss championship in his first year in charge (2017) and also in 2019. On January 28, 2020, Jalonen was fired by SC Bern, following bad results. Hans Kossmann took over at the helm of the team. Bern was ranked 9th in the Swiss championship when Jalonen was sacked. In March 2022, Jalonen signed a head coaching contract with the Czech national team until May 2024.

Jalonen accepted a two-year contract to coach the Finnish U20 national team, covering the 2023 and 2024 IIHF U20 world championships.

Awards and titles

As a player
 SM-Liiga champion, Kanada-malja: 1988–89, 1989–90, 1990–91, 1992–93
 SM-Liiga silver: 1986–87
 SM-Liiga bronze: 1979–80, 1983–84, 1988–89,1993–94
 Jarmo Wasama memorial trophy winner: 1979
 Veli-Pekka Ketola trophy winner: 1987
 SM-liiga First All-Star Team: 1987, 1989
 IIHF European Cup silver: 1989–90
 Ligue Magnus champion: 1994–95
 Six Nations Tournament champion: 1995–96
 Ligue Magnus silver: 1995–96

As a coach
 SM-Liiga champion, Kanada-malja: 1998–99, 1999–00, 2000–01 (as assistant coach). 2004–05, 2006–07, 2007–08, 2010–11 (as head coach)
 Kalevi Numminen trophy winner: 2005, 2007
 KHL silver: 2013–14 (as head coach)
 Silver medal at IIHF World U20 Championships: 2001 (as head coach)
 Silver medal at IIHF World Championships: 2016 (as head coach)
 Bronze medal at IIHF World Championships: 2022 (as head coach)
 National League champion: 2016–17, 2018-2019 (as head coach)

Career statistics

Regular season and playoffs

International

References

External links

1960 births
Calgary Flames players
Colorado Flames players
Edmonton Oilers players
Finland men's national ice hockey team coaches
Finnish ice hockey centres
Living people
Sportspeople from Oulu
Rouen HE 76 players
Finnish ice hockey coaches
SC Bern coaches
Undrafted National Hockey League players
Czech Republic men's national ice hockey team coaches
Finnish expatriate ice hockey players in Canada
Finnish expatriate ice hockey players in France
Finnish expatriate ice hockey coaches
Finnish expatriate sportspeople in the Czech Republic
Finnish expatriate ice hockey players in Sweden
Finnish expatriate sportspeople in Switzerland
Finnish expatriate sportspeople in Russia